Fort Simpson (Slavey language: Łı́ı́dlı̨ı̨ Kų́ę́ "place where rivers come together") is a village, the only one in the entire territory, in the Dehcho Region of the Northwest Territories, Canada. The community is located on an island at the confluence of the Mackenzie and Liard rivers. Both rivers were traditionally trade routes for the Hudson's Bay Company and the native Dene people of the area.

Fort Simpson is the regional centre of the Dehcho and is the gateway to the scenic South Nahanni River and the Nahanni National Park Reserve. Fort Simpson can be reached by air, water and road and has full secondary and elementary school service. The Mackenzie Highway was extended to Fort Simpson in 1970-71.

The central section of the community is on an island near the south bank of the Mackenzie River, but industrial areas and rural residential areas are located along the highway as far as the Fort Simpson Airport, just beyond which is the Liard River ferry crossing.

Demographics

In 2016, 890 people identified as Indigenous peoples. Of these the majority, 770, of the residents are First Nations with 95 Métis and 20 Inuit. The main languages are South Slavey and English.

History
Fort Simpson was first started as a fur trading site in 1803 then named Fort of the Forks. The Village of Fort Simpson was a permanent settlement in July 1822 when the Hudson's Bay Company constructed a trading post, naming it for George Simpson, then the Governor of Rupert's Land. Until 1910 Fort Simpson was "a company town", with some participation by the Anglican and Roman Catholic Missions. The Dené know it as Łı́ı́dlı̨ı̨ Kų́ę́, meaning the place where the rivers come together. It was designated a National Historic Site of Canada in 1969.

Pope John Paul II attempted to visit the community in September 1984 as part of his Canadian tour, but was prevented from landing due to fog; in an address over the radio from Yellowknife, he promised to visit in the future. He did so in September 1987 near the end of the tour of the United States, making a side trip to Fort Simpson.

Culture
There are two main annual festivals which occur in Fort Simpson.

The first which is held in March is known as the "Beavertail Jamboree". This is a winter carnival which includes traditional games, snowmobile races, and talent shows.

The other festival is the "Open Sky Festival" which is held annually on or around the Canada Day long weekend. The Open Sky Festival is a multi-disciplinary arts festival which has occurred annually since 2001. Festival events include musical, theatrical, and other performances as well as traditional Dehcho Dene Crafts, visual arts, new media exhibitions, workshops, and demonstrations. The Open Sky festival is hosted by the Open Sky Creative Society, a multi-disciplinary arts organization serving artists working in the Dehcho region.

The Dene of the community are represented by the Łı́ı́dlı̨ı̨ Kų́ę́ First Nation and the Métis by Fort Simpson Métis Local 52. Both groups belong to the Dehcho First Nations.

Climate
Fort Simpson has a subarctic climate (Köppen Dfc) with long, cold winters and warm but short summers. July temperatures are unusually warm for such northerly areas, which demonstrates the extreme continental nature of the area's climate. However, the heat quickly turns into long, cold winters when daylight hours turn drastically shorter. Transition seasons are extremely short, and the year is on average dominated by the winter and to a lesser extent, summer. Most of the precipitation falls during the summer months.

Notable residents 
 Jim Antoine, eighth premier of the Northwest Territories
 William Lafferty, politician, Canadian Forces officer and news paper columnist
 Melaw Nakehk'o, actress, artist, and activist
 Nick Sibbeston, fourth premier of the Northwest Territories.
 Dahti Tsetso, Tłı̨chǫ environmentalist and educator, born in Fort Simpson

See also
 List of municipalities in the Northwest Territories
Fort Simpson Island Airport
Fort Simpson Island Water Aerodrome
Fort Simpson/Canadian Helicopters Heliport
Fort Simpson/(Great Slave) Heliport

References

External links

 Official site

Communities in the Dehcho Region
Dene communities
Hudson's Bay Company forts
Heritage sites in the Northwest Territories
National Historic Sites in the Northwest Territories
Populated places on the Mackenzie River
Villages in the Northwest Territories